Captiva is the third studio album from Christian rock band Falling Up, released on October 2, 2007. The band recorded the album with Seattle producer Aaron Sprinkle, who also handled the production duties for the band's debut, Crashings.

As opposed to the band's first two albums, Crashings and Dawn Escapes, Captiva is more alternative and experimental rock driven as a whole, similar to some elements that were present on Dawn Escapes, but much less hard rock-driven, and continues to show a change in the band's musical direction. It also features much less distorted guitar rhythms, and nearly all turntable effects present on previous albums are omitted.  It is the final album to feature keyboardist Adam Taylor and only album with guitarist Micah Sannan, who would both depart from the group shortly before the album's release.

"Hotel Aquarium" was the album's first single. "Goodnight Gravity", "How They Made Cameras", "A Guide to Marine Life", and "Maps" have also been posted on the band's PureVolume page. The album reached the Billboard Top Christian albums chart peaking at No. 19 and reached the Top Heatseekers albums chart peaking at No. 7. It has sold just over 20,000 copies worldwide.

Track listing
All tracks by Jessy Ribordy except where noted.

"A Guide to Marine Life" - 4:02
"Hotel Aquarium" (Ribordy, Aaron Sprinkle) - 2:45
"Goodnight Gravity" (Sprinkle) - 3:22
"Captiva" - 3:30
"Helicopters" - 3:50
"Maps" (Ribordy, Chris Stevens, Sprinkle) - 3:26
"How They Made Cameras" - 4:07
"Good Morning Planetarium" (Ribordy, Sprinkle) - 3:15
"Murexa" (Ribordy, Randy Torres) - 2:56
"Drago or the Dragons" - 4:23
"Arch to Achtilles" - 4:47
"The Dark Side of Indoor Track Meets" - 5:39

Personnel
Falling Up
 Jessy Ribordy – vocals, keyboards on "Hotel Aquarium", "Goodnight Gravity", "Maps", and "Murexa"
 Micah Sannan – guitars
 Adam Taylor – keyboards, synthesizers, programming, backing vocals
 Jeremy Miller – bass guitar
 Josh Shroy – drums, percussion

Production
 Aaron Sprinkle - producer, engineer, guitars on tracks 2, 3, 6, and 9
 Randy Torres - engineer, guitars and bass guitar on tracks 2, 3, 6 and 9
 The Busha Fusha Disaster - drums on tracks 2, 3, 6, and 9
 Chris Carmichael - string arrangements, performance, and recording
 Compound Recording, Seattle, Washington – recording location
 J.R. McNeely – mixing
 Elm South Studio, Franklin, Tennessee – mixing location
 Troy Glessner – mastering
 Spectre Studio – mastering location

Singles
"Hotel Aquarium"
"Goodnight Gravity"
"Good Morning Planetarium"
"Maps"

References

External links
 E-Card

2007 albums
Falling Up (band) albums
BEC Recordings albums
Albums produced by Aaron Sprinkle